Sanchai Ratiwatana and Sonchat Ratiwatana were the defending champions.
Lee Hsin-han and Peng Hsien-yin won the final 7–6(7–3), 7–5 against Lim Yong-Kyu and Nam Ji-Sung.

Seeds

Draw

Draw

References
 Main Draw

Samsung Securities Cup - Doubles
2012 Doubles